Morning in the Bowl of Night is the fifth album by Melbourne singer-songwriter Lisa Miller. All songs were composed by Miller. The album peaked at number 14 on the Australian heatseakers.

It was released in Australia on 21 April 2007, and was nominated in the 2007 ARIA Awards for "Best Adult Contemporary Album".

Track listing
Upside
Such a Find
Snowman
(She's a) Shining Star
Point Ormond
Amused & Confused
Bottle Up My Tears (prologue)
Bottle Up My Tears
Motherless
Love Will Carry You
Lucky Dip Roses

References

2007 albums
Lisa Miller (singer-songwriter) albums